State Route 192 (SR 192) is part of Maine's system of numbered state highways.  It runs  from an intersection with U.S. Route 1 (US 1) in Machias to an intersection with SR 9 in Wesley.  The route is also known as Northfield Road in Machias and Junior Williams Road in Wesley.

Major junctions

References

External links

Floodgap Roadgap's RoadsAroundME: Maine State Route 192

192
Transportation in Washington County, Maine